The ethmoid bulla (or ethmoidal bulla) is an elevation on the lateral wall of the middle meatus of the nose. It is produced by middle ethmoidal cells. It develops during the first trimester of gestation, and varies significantly based on the size of air cells.

Structure 
The ethmoid bulla is on the lateral wall of the middle meatus of the nose. It is produced by middle ethmoidal cells, which are contained within this bulla, and open on or near to it (often just below it).

Just below the bulla is a curved fissure, the hiatus semilunaris. The maxillary sinus also opens below the bulla. It is the largest among the middle ethmoidal cells.

Development 
The ethmoid bulla begins to develop between 8 weeks and 12 weeks of gestation.

Variation 
The size of the bulla varies with that of its contained cells. The bulla may be a pneumatised cell or a bony prominence found in middle meatus.

References 

Nose